Colored Frames is a 2007 documentary film taking a look at the role of fine art in the Civil Rights Movement, as well as the legacy of discrimination in the art community both historically and contemporarily. The documentary is a showcase of a wide variety of works primarily by African-American artists, and a discussion of modern sociopolitical topics focused on race, gender, and class.
Beginning in late 2011 the film began airing nationally in the U.S. via American Public Television.

Artists who appeared on camera in this documentary included:
 Benny Andrews
 John Ashford
 Gustave Blache III
 Marva Huston
 Linda Goode Bryant
 Mary Schmidt Campbell
 Nanette Carter
 Ed Clark
 Francks Deceus
 Larry Hampton
 Gordon C. James
 June Kelly of the June Kelly Gallery
 Wangechi Mutu
 Ron Ollie
 Danny Simmons
 Duane Smith
 Tafa

See also
 Civil rights movement in popular culture

References

External links
  
 

2007 films
2007 documentary films
African-American art
Documentary films about the civil rights movement
Documentary films about the visual arts
2000s English-language films
2000s American films